Hampden–Sydney College is a men's liberal arts college in Hampden Sydney, Virginia. Individuals are sorted by category and alphabetized within each category. The Alumni Association of Hampden–Sydney College considers all former students to be members, whether they graduated or not, and does not generally differentiate between graduates and non-graduates when identifying alumni. Currently, Hampden-Sydney has an estimated 8,000 living alumni.

Arts media and entertainment
 William H. Armstrong: teacher, author of the Newbery Medal-winning Sounder; Class of 1936
 Tyler Barstow: co-founder of Vinyl Me, Please; Class of 2010
 Stephen Colbert: comedian, host of The Late Show on CBS; studied philosophy for two years before transferring to Northwestern University and graduating in 1986
 Scott Cooper: actor, writer, producer of films, Gods and Generals, Broken Trail; directed and wrote screenplay for the Academy-Award-winning film Crazy Heart; Class of 1992
 Christopher J. Cyphers: Provost at the School of Visual Arts, New York City; Class of 1988 
Leigh Buckner Hanes; lawyer; poet laureate of Virginia(1949); editor of The Lyric magazine
James B. Hughes: Ohio delegate and militia colonel; founder of three newspapers including the Minnesota Chronicle, abolitionist
Charles Hurt: opinion editor for The Washington Times, Fox News contributor, editor of The Drudge Report; Class of 1995
Matthew Karnitschnig: journalist; Chief Europe correspondent for Politico 
 Michael Knight: author of short stories, novels, and screenplays; winner of the Playboy Fiction Writing Contest; Class of 1992
Samuel Logan investigative journalist
Jonathan Martin: the national political reporter for The New York Times; class of 1999
 Thomas B. Mason: U.S. attorney; actor, Mississippi Burning, Crimes of the Heart and Gods and Generals; Class of 1940
 John Phillips: musician, member of The Mamas & the Papas; attended but did not graduate; Class of 1956
 Robert Porterfield: actor (Seargeant York); founder of the Barter Theatre; attended, did not graduate, but received honorary degree of Doctor of Letters for his work in the theatre in 1948
 William Smithers: actor, TV and film, Dallas, Papillion, Scorpio, Star Trek; attended 1946–1948 before transferring to Catholic University to study acting; Class of 1950
Chris Stirewalt: former digital politics editor Fox News Channel; American politics editor for The Dispatch; Class of 1997
 Skipp Sudduth: actor, Third Watch, Ronin, Clockers; Class of 1979

Business

 George Albright: financial advisor, Managing Director JP Morgan Private Bank—Washington DC
John M. Burge: Director Lazard Asset Management, New York City
David Camden: Executive Vice President SunTrust Bank-Savannah, Georgia region
 E. Rhodes Carpenter: founder of the Carpenter Company, leading manufacturer of urethane foams; class of 1929
 Robert Citrone: billionaire hedge fund manager of Discovery Capital Management; part owner of Pittsburgh Steelers; Class of 1987
 James Cook: senior vice president of The U.S. Russia Investment Fund (TUSRIF) and Delta Capital Management; co-founder of Aurora Russia Limited
Garrison Coward: venture capitalist; former managing partner Merger Partners—Washington DC.; deputy secretary of commerce for Virginia; Class of 2012
Bradford K. Harris: president of James River Bank for the Roanoke market; Class of 1994
Richard F. Dunlap: President of Norfolk and Western Railway(1982–1986)
H. Hiter Harris: cofounder and principal of Harris Williams and Co., largest middle market investment bank; Class of 1983
 Steven T. Huff: Chairman of TF Concrete Forming Systems; owner of Pensmore; Class of 1973
 Harry Jones: managing partner Edge Capital Group, major regional wealth management firm
 Maurice Jones: Rhodes Scholar; former deputy Secretary of HUD; former Secretary of Commerce and Trade for the State of Virginia; Class of 1986
 Sekou Kaalund: Managing director JP Morgan, New York
Camm Morton: real estate developer, investment banker; former president of Western Development, originator of the Mills retail concept; former president of Factory Outlet Stores; co-founder of VR Business Brokers
Jim Mullens: managing director of the Bundy Group, a leading regional investment bank   
 Alphonso O'Neil-White: First African-American student at the college; Chairman of the Board (retired) of Blue Cross/Blue Shield; Class of 1972
Bob Ramsey: cfo of BankMobile, a top 15 US banking corporation
William Lawrence Scott: industrialist; president of two railroad companies including the Erie and Pittsburgh Railroad
 Warren Thompson: Founder and CEO of Thompson Hospitality, a top twenty African-American owned business; Class of 1981
William Toomey: president BB&T Bank for the central Texas region 
Litz Van Dyke: ceo of Carter Bank and Trust; Class of 1986
T.C. Wilson; chief investment officer for the Doctor's Company-largest doctor owned malpractice insurance company

Education
Robert Campbell Anderson Jr.; minister; founder and first president of Montreat College; class of 1887
Daniel Baker: Presbyterian minister, founder of Austin College; attended 1811–1813
James Blythe: minister, abolitionist, second (acting) president of Transylvania University; founding President of Hanover College; 
James L. Bugg Jr.: historian; first chancellor of University of Missouri at St. Louis; second president of Old Dominion University, class of 1941
 Willis Henry Bocock: first dean of The University of Georgia Graduate School, 1910–1928; prominent professor of Classics; Class of 1884
 Charles William Dabney: chemist; President of University of Cincinnati(1887–1904) and University of Tennessee(1904–1920); Class of 1873
 George H. Denny: President of Washington and Lee University 1899–1911; president of the University of Alabama 1911–1936, and interim president in 1941; Class of 1891
 Joseph Dupuy Eggleston: President of Virginia Agricultural and Mechanical College and polytechnic Institute (now Virginia Tech) 1913–1919; President of Hampden Sydney College 1919–1939.
 Landon Garland: President of Randolph-Macon College, President of the University of Alabama, and founding Chancellor of Vanderbilt University; Class of 1829
Joseph Lane: political scientist, author; provost of Bethany College
 George Wilson McPhail: President of Lafayette College and sixth president of Davidson College
 Mark A. Newcomb: historian; headmaster Holy Rosary Academy of Anchorage, Alaska 
Walter Stephenson Newman: tenth president of Virginia Tech 1947–1962; one of the co-founders of the Future Farmers of America; president of the National Bank of Blacksburg; Class of 1917 
John Bunyan Shearer: minister, president of Stewart College—building it up as Southwestern Presbyterian University, eighth president of Davidson College; class of 1851
 Paul S. Trible Jr.: President of Christopher Newport University 1996–2022; former U.S. Senator and U.S. Representative from Virginia; Class of 1968
 Moses Waddel: Fifth President of the University of Georgia, 1819–1829; prominent educator of his time (many southern leaders studied under Waddel, including John C. Calhoun); Class of 1791

Law and politics
 George M. Bibb: Chief Justice of Kentucky; U.S. Senator from Kentucky; seventeenth U.S. Secretary of the Treasury; Class of 1791
 Thomas S. Bocock: Speaker of the Confederate House; Class of 1838
 William Henry Brodnax: General of Virginia militia during the Nat Turner Rebellion; Virginia legislator, abolitionist; class of 1804 or 1805
 William H. Cabell: Governor of Virginia; judge on Virginia Supreme Court; Class of 1789
Dabney Carr; lawyer, author, Justice of the Virginia Supreme Court(1824–1837)
William Crawford: lawyer; U.S. attorney; member of Alabama senate; U.S. district and circuit judge
 James Crowell: former Director of the Executive Office of the U. S. Attorneys; current associate judge on the Superior Court of the District of Columbia
 William Daniel: Virginia House of Delegates; judge of the Virginia Supreme Court of Appeals; Class of 1826
 Clement C. Dickinson: Missouri state senator; United States Representative from Missouri; class of 1869
 John Wayles Eppes: United States Representative and Senator; Class of 1786
 John A. Field Jr.: United States Federal Judge; Class of 1932
 Samuel Lightfoot Flournoy: West Virginia State Senator and lawyer; Class of 1868
 Thomas S. Flournoy: United States Representative and Confederate cavalry colonel in the Civil War
 Hamilton Rowan Gamble: Missouri state legislator; presiding judge in state supreme court; provisional (Unionist) governor of Missouri
 William Branch Giles: Member of both houses of Congress; Governor of Virginia; Class of 1791
 Henry Bell Gilkeson: West Virginia Senator, West Virginia House of Delegates member, and Principal of the West Virginia Schools for the Deaf and Blind
John Gill Jr.: attorney; Maryland state delegate; police commissioner of Baltimore; U.S.representative
 Jim Harrell: North Carolina legislator
 William Henry Harrison: Ninth president of the United States; Class of 1791
 Eugene Hickok: U.S. Under Secretary of Education; Acting Deputy Secretary of Education; former Secretary of Education of Pennsylvania; founding member and former chairman of the Education Leaders Council; Class of 1972
William A. Hocker: attorney; member of the Florida legislature; justice of the Supreme Court of Florida (1903–1915)
 Roszell (Rod) Hunter: attorney; former senior director US National Security Council 
 Robert Hurt: former Congressman for Virginia's Fifth Congressional District; former member of the Virginia Senate and the Virginia House of Delegates; Class of 1991
 Thomas M. Jackson Jr.: president of the Virginia Board of Education; former member of the Virginia House of Delegates; Class of 1979
William Giles Jones: attorney; member of Alabama legislature; US district court judge 
 Jim Jordan: former campaign manager for presidential candidate John Kerry; Class of 1983
 John Thornton Knight: Brigadier General; Commandant of Cadets at the Virginia Polytechnic Institute; Chief Quartermaster, A.E.F; Class of 1880
Monroe Leigh: classicist; attorney; chief legal advisor to the State Department; US member International Court of Arbitration, The Hague; Class of 1940 
 Thomas W. Ligon: Maryland delegate; U.S. Representative; 30th Governor of Maryland; Class of 1830
 Jonathan Martin: the national political correspondent for the New York Times; Class of 1999
 Elisha E. Meredith: Virginia state senator; United States Representative
 Sheppard Miller, III: businessman; Secretary of Transportation for Virginia 
 W. Tayloe Murphy Jr. : lawyer, state delegate, Virginia Secretary of Natural Resources 2002–2006; Class of 1953
 Rod O'Connor:  EVP Europe for AEG Facilities; Chief of Staff for the U.S. Department of Energy; CEO of the 2000 and 2004 Democratic National Conventions; political aide to Vice President Gore; trustee of X Prize Foundation; Class of 1992
 Chris Peace: member of the Virginia House of Delegates, 97th District; Class of 1998
 William Ballard Preston: U.S. Secretary of the Navy, 1849–1850; U.S. House of Representatives, 1847–1849; author of the "Preston Resolution", the bill of Virginia's secession; Class of 1824
 Paul Reiber: Chief Justice of the Vermont State Supreme Court; Class of 1970 
 Robert Christian Rickers: Treasurer of Lunenburg County Virginia; Class of 1999
 Alexander Rives: Judge of the Virginia Supreme Court; Judge of the United States District Court for the Western District of Virginia; Class of 1825
 William Cabell Rives: U.S. Representative from Virginia; U.S. Senator; Minister to France; Confederate Representative; attended but did not graduate
 William Prescott Mills Schwind: attorney; partner at Fulbright & Jaworski; Class of 1993
 W. Sydnor Settle: retired partner at Simpson Thatcher & Bartlett; Class of 1955
 Julious P. Smith Jr.: CEO of Williams Mullen; Class of 1965
 William B. Spong Jr.: U.S. Senator from Virginia; 17th dean of William and Mary Law School; Class of 1941
 William M. "Bill" Stanley Jr. Senator, Virginia State Senate 2011–present; Trial Attorney, Franklin Co. Virginia, Class of 1989
John W. Stevenson: attorney; member of both houses of the US Congress; 25th governor of Kentucky; attended 1828–1830 
 Robert Strange: U.S. Senator from North Carolina; author of Eoneguski ("the first North Carolina novel"); Class of 1814
 John Leighton Stuart: U.S. Ambassador to China, 1946–1949; President, Yenching University, Beijing, 1919–1946; Class of 1896
 Paul S. Trible Jr.: Former U.S. Senator and U.S. Representative from Virginia; current president of Christopher Newport University; Class of 1968
 Lee Trinkle: 49th Governor of Virginia 1922–1926; Class of 1896
 Abraham B. Venable: United States representative and senator from Virginia, first president of the First National Bank of Virginia
Charles "Casey" Viser: superior court judge in North Carolina
 Leighton D. Yates Jr.: partner at Holland and Knight (Orlando); Class of 1968 
 James R. Young: first North Carolina insurance commissioner, 1899–1921
 W. James Young: attorney; Staff Attorney, National Right to Work Legal Defense Foundation, Inc.; Class of 1986

Others
William D. Bunch: lawyer; Major General—assistant to the Judge Advocate General of the US Air Force; class of 1987
Royall E. Cabell: the Commissioner of Internal Revenue(1909–1913)
 MSG Matt Eversmann: Army Ranger who fought in the Battle of Mogadishu; portrayed by Josh Hartnett in the film Black Hawk Down; Class of 1988 (did not graduate due to enlistment in the Army, but was awarded an honorary degree in August 2000)
 Robert E. Livingston Jr.:  Adjutant General of South Carolina; Class of 1978
 William Madison: army general—War of 1812, militia man—Hampden-Sidney Boys 1776; brother of President James Madison
 Frederick Riedlin: Assistant Commandant U.S. Coast Guard—Chief of Aviation; Class of 1988

Religion
 Thomas Atkinson: Third Bishop of the Episcopal Diocese of North Carolina; one of the ten bishops who joined to found the University of the South: Sewanee; founder of Saint Augustine's University; Class of 1825
 Robert Lewis Dabney: Theologian; Chief of Staff for Stonewall Jackson; biographer of Jackson; Confederate Army Chaplain; attended circa 1835–1836, graduated from the University of Virginia
 Edward Baptist: Reverend; one of the co-founders and first instructor of University of Richmond; Class of 1813
 Ward Davis: minister; chaplain at Cornell University 
 Henry H. "Chip" Edens III: Rector of Christ Church Episcopal, Charlotte, North Carolina; Class of 1992 
 William Henry Foote: Presbyterian minister and historian; Doctor of Divinity from Hampden–Sydney College in 1847; served on its Board of Trustees 1851–1870
 Robert Atkinson Gibson: sixth Bishop of the Episcopal Diocese of Virginia (1902–1919); Class of 1867
 Nimrod Hughes: Theologian, pamphleteer, land speculator; published sensationalist visions of an apocalyptic event in June 1812 which was discussed in the correspondence of John Adams, Thomas Jefferson, and John Taylor of Caroline; Class of 1794
 Arthur Heath Light: Fourth Episcopal Bishop of the Diocese of Southwest Virginia; Class of 1951
 Frank Clayton Matthews: Bishop for the Office of Pastoral Development for the Episcopal Church, formerly Suffragan Bishop of the Episcopal Diocese of Virginia; Class of 1970
 William R. Moody: third Episcopal Bishop of the Diocese of Lexington; founder of the Washington School of Religion; Class of 1922.
 Charles Clifton Penick: Missionary Bishop of the Episcopal Church; Bishop of Cape Palmas, West Africa (1825–1914)
 J. Dwight Pentecost: Christian theologian known for his book Things to Come; Distinguished Professor of Bible Exposition, Emeritus, Dallas Theological Seminary, 1955–2014; Class of 1937
 Francis A. Schaeffer: Theologian, philosopher, Presbyterian pastor; known for writings and establishing the L'Abri community in Switzerland; author of A Christian Manifesto; Class of 1935
 Spenser C.D. Simrill: Dean of St. Mark's Episcopal Cathedral, Minneapolis, Minnesota; Class of 1970 
V. Neil Wyrick: pastor, prominent Christian author and actor; Class of 1950

Science and medicine
 W. Randolph Chitwood Jr., MD: Pioneered robotic cardiac surgery in the US for minimally invasive heart surgery; Class of 1968
Hardy Cross; civil engineer; developed the moment distribution method for analysing indeterminate motion in buildings; Class of 1902
 John Peter Mettauer: First plastic surgeon in US; Class of 1807
 Thomas Dent Mutter, MD: innovative surgeon; medical professor; benefactor of Philadelphia tourist attraction Mütter Museum; Class of 1830
 John Armstrong Shackelford, MD: Johns Hopkins University; surgeon, Shackelford Hospital; surgeon-in-chief, Martinsville General Hospital, Martinsville, Virginia; Class of 1914
 Luther Sheldon Jr.: medical doctor, rear admiral U.S. Navy—Assistant Chief Bureau of Medicine in WW II; Class of 1903
William Mynn Thornton: classicist, mathematician; first dean of engineering at the University of Virginia, the second engineering school in the USA

Sports
 Griff Aldrich: Head men's basketball coach, Longwood University; Class of 1996
 James C. Hickey III: Member of Fly Fishing Team USA; Class of 1993
 Bob Humphreys: Professional baseball player—played in 1964 World Series; Class of 1958
 Tom Miller: NFL player; assistant GM of Green Bay Packers; member of Packers' Hall of Fame; Class of 1943
 Ryan Odom: Head men's basketball coach, Utah State University; Class of 1996
 Ryan Silverfield: Head football coach, University of Memphis; Class of 2003
 Russell D. Turner: Men's basketball head coach of UC Irvine; former assistant coach of the Golden State Warriors; Class of 1992

References

Hampden-Sydney College alumni